Paul James Hardy (September 17, 1910 – August 1979) was an American baseball catcher in the Negro leagues. He played from 1932 to 1945 with several teams.

A native of Meridian, Mississippi, Hardy served in the US Army during World War II. He died in Chicago, Illinois in 1979 at age 68.

References

External links
 and Seamheads

1910 births
1979 deaths
Indianapolis ABCs (1931–1933) players
Birmingham Black Barons players
Chicago American Giants players
Kansas City Monarchs players
Montgomery Grey Sox players
Baseball players from Mississippi
People from Meridian, Mississippi
Baseball players from Chicago
Nashville Elite Giants players
Columbus Elite Giants players
Baseball catchers
20th-century African-American sportspeople
United States Army personnel of World War II